The Pick of Destiny Tour was a worldwide concert tour by American rock band Tenacious D. The tour was in support of the band's 2006 film, Tenacious D in The Pick of Destiny and its accompanying soundtrack The Pick of Destiny, released as the band's second studio album. The tour visited North America, Europe and Australia, beginning on November 11, 2006 and ending on February 21, 2007, featuring 32 shows in total. Footage from the shows at the Paramount Theatre in Seattle on February 16 and 17, 2007 were released on The Complete Master Works 2 DVD and Blu-ray in November 2008.

The duo had previously toured only acoustically, therefore, this tour was the first ever series of live shows to feature Black and Gass on stage with a full backing-band, as they had only previously performed with a band in the recording studio and on occasional TV appearances. The backing band for the tour consisted of guitarists John Konesky and John Spiker from Gass' side-project Trainwreck, as well as Bad Religion drummer Brooks Wackerman. This was also the band's first ever major concert tour with an elaborate stage set and lighting, as they had previously only toured with little to no set design.

Average set list
Kyle's Apartment (acoustic set)

"Kielbasa"
"History"
"Flash" (Queen cover) / "Wonderboy"
"Dio"
"Lee"
"Sax-a-Boom"
"The Road"
Hell (full band set)

"Kickapoo"
"Karate"
"Dude (I Totally Miss You)"
"Kyle Quit The Band"
"Friendship"
"The Metal"  
"Break In-City (Storm the Gate!)" 
"Car Chase City"
"Papagenu (He's My Sassafrass)"
"Master Exploder" (tape)
"Beelzeboss (The Final Showdown)"
"Double Team"
Encore 
"Fuck Her Gently"
"Tribute"
"Pinball Wizard" / "There's A Doctor" / "Go to the Mirror!" (The Who cover medley)

Opening acts

In the US and the UK shows opened up with comedian Neil Hamburger. The US shows at Madison Square Garden and Arlington Theater saw Supafloss open in addition to Neil Hamburger.

In Australia, Tex Perkins and Tim Rogers opened, playing as T'n'T as well as Dave McCormack at other shows.

Jack Black also gave two young boys the opportunity of letting them open Tenacious D's show in Christchurch, New Zealand after seeing them busking in Cathedral Square. Max Tetley, 11, and Alex Philpot, 10, performed "All Along the Watchtower", "Knockin' On Heaven's Door" and "Mr. Tambourine Man" in front of the crowd.

Internet Archive albums

Three albums were released with the explicit permission of Tenacious D. These live shows have been recorded and released through Internet Archive and are available for free digital download.

Tour dates

Personnel
This tour, unlike any other Tenacious D tour, featured a full band, as well as Lee. The band played more shows in arenas and amphitheatres, moving away from the smaller venues that dominated earlier tours.  Shows also featured more elaborate stage and lighting effects. Jack Black says of the expenses of the tour: "We’re actually losing money on this because we want to do something for The Fans. It's going to be better than The Wall. It starts off in Kyle's apartment and ends up in hell."

Band
Jack Black – lead vocals, rhythm acoustic guitar
Kyle Gass – lead acoustic guitar, backing vocals
John Konesky (Antichrist) – electric guitar
John Spiker (Charlie Chaplin) – bass, backing vocals
Brooks Wackerman (Colonel Sanders) – drums
JR Reed (Lee) - additional vocals

Incidents
 On November 24, 2006 at Chicago's UIC Pavilion, a stage-hand was seriously injured and fell off the stage whilst installing a strobe light. Paul Fire and Marine Insurance Company and The American Insurance Company both insured Tenacious D. The stagehand was assisting one of Tenacious D’s subcontractors, Ed & Ted’s Excellent Lighting Inc, and eventually settled his suit in 2014 for $1 million.

References

External links
 Official site
 Tenacious D Live Music Archive
 Description of equipment used on tour

2006 concert tours
2007 concert tours
Tenacious D concert tours